Losar may refer to:

Culture
 Losar, a festival in Tibetan Buddhism

Places
 Losar Baoli, a stepwell in the Islamabad Capital Territory, Pakistan
 Losar Khas, a village in Spiti valley, Himachal Pradesh, India

See also
 Loser (disambiguation)